Ivan Božić (23 April 1915 — 20 August 1977) was a Yugoslavian historian and academic. He was expert in history of medieval Zeta and the Venetian Republic's policy toward its coastal areas.

Works 
 * 
 Dubrovnik i Turska u XIV i XV veku , Naučna knjiga,  Belgrade, 1952.
 Dohodak carski-povodom 198. člana Dušanovog zakonika , Naučno delo, Belgrade, 1956.
 Paštrovske isprave 16.-18. vijeka, Naučno delo,  Belgrade, 1959
 Pregled istorije jugoslovenskih naroda, Zavod za izdavanje udžbenika Narodne Republike Srbije,  Belgrade, 1960.
 Istorija ljudskog društva i kulture od najstarijih vremena do XI veka za I razred gimnazije, Zavod za izdavanje udžbenika Socijalističke Republike Srbije,  Belgrade, 1962.
 Pregled istorije od XI do XIX veka a II razred gimnazije prirodno-matematičkog smerra, Zavod za izdavanje udžbenika Socijalističke Republike Srbije, Belgrade, 1963.
 
 
 
 Istorija Jugoslavije, Prosveta, Belgrade, co-author
 Pregled istorije od XI do XX veka za II razred gimnazije prirodno-matematičkog smerra, Zavod za udžbenike i nasdtavna sredstva Srbije, Belgrade, 1973, co-author

References

External links 
 Biography on the website of SANU

1915 births
1977 deaths
People from Makarska
Yugoslav historians
Members of the Serbian Academy of Sciences and Arts
Academic staff of the University of Belgrade
University of Belgrade Faculty of Philosophy alumni